Trevor George Long (1 July 1931 – 15 November 2006) was an English professional footballer. His clubs included Wolverhampton Wanderers, Reading and Gillingham. He made 79 Football League appearances, and later played for Yeovil Town in the Southern Football League as a semi-professional.

Playing career
Long first represented Mitchells and Butlers in the Birmingham Works Football League. He signed as a 16-year-old amateur with Wolverhampton Wanderers and served two seasons as a professional having been encouraged to sign professional terms by manager Stan Cullis when he was 19-years-old. His time with the club coincided with his national service which he completed at RAF Stafford. In the 1951-52 season he featured 28 times for Wolves in The Central League and was part of the team that won the 1951-52 title. 

In July, 1952, he transferred to Gillingham of the Football League Third Division South, who, in 1950, were voted in to the Football League when it expanded from 88 teams to 92. During his first season at Priestfield he was joint top scorer contributing 10 goals in 34 appearances and scored 1 goal in 3 FA Cup appearances. This made him the club's joint leading league goal scorer with Ken Lambert. In 1953-54 he made 26 league appearances scoring 4 goals and in 1954-55 he represented Gillingham 7 times.

References

1931 births
2006 deaths
Sportspeople from Smethwick
English footballers
Association football wingers
Wolverhampton Wanderers F.C. players
Gillingham F.C. players
Reading F.C. players
Yeovil Town F.C. players
English Football League players